Tim Connelly (born ca. 1976–1977) is an American basketball executive who is the President of Basketball Operations of the Minnesota Timberwolves of the National Basketball Association (NBA). He previously worked for the Washington Wizards and New Orleans Hornets, before becoming President of Basketball Operations at the Denver Nuggets. He served for the Nuggets from June 2013 onwards, until 23 May 2022, when Connelly agreed to a five-year, $40 million contract with the Minnesota Timberwolves to take over in the same role within the organization.

Early life
Tim Connelly was raised in Baltimore, Maryland. He grew up with four other brothers and two sisters. After attending Fordham University in New York, Connelly transferred to Catholic University in Washington D.C. for his junior year.

Executive career

Washington Wizards
In his junior year, Connelly wrote to Chuck Douglas, the director of college scouting for the Washington Wizards. He became an intern for the Wizards in 1996 in the basketball operations department. He became an assistant video coordinator in 1999. Connelly became a full-time scout in 2000 and was promoted to the director of player personnel. During his tenure with the Wizards, Connelly worked under NBA legend Wes Unseld.

New Orleans Hornets
In 2010, Connelly joined the front office of the New Orleans Hornets. He became assistant general manager under Dell Demps. Connelly's duties included scouting, trade negotiations, player contracts, and draft preparations.

Denver Nuggets
On June 17, 2013, Connelly was named as the executive vice president of basketball operations and general manager of the Denver Nuggets. He replaced former NBA Executive of the Year, Masai Ujiri. On June 15, 2017, it was announced that Connelly would be promoted to being the team's president of basketball operations for the purpose of retaining assistant general manager Artūras Karnišovas as the team's general manager. After years of missing out on the playoffs, Connelly and Karnišovas would help lead the team to the 2019 NBA playoffs after previously missing out the first five seasons under his guidance.

In 2020, Connelly finished in ninth place for the Executive of the Year Award.

In 2021, Connelly was responsible in part for bringing over Aaron Gordon and JaVale McGee. Connelly claims to have asked for permission from All-Star Center Nikola Jokić before accepting the Gordon trade. Following the trade, Connelly said “The whole idea of trading people is really kind of gross to me...It doesn’t sound right. It doesn’t sit well with me...we have to acknowledge we’re in a different place than we’ve ever been. The playoff success last year, I think, speaks to what we’re capable of. I think we have the best coach in the league. I think we have the best player in the league. These guys have organically grown together and proven that they can beat anybody when we’re playing our brand of basketball.”

Minnesota Timberwolves
On May 23, 2022, Connelly was hired by the Minnesota Timberwolves as the president of basketball operations. He was reportedly signed to a 5-year, $40 million contract by the Timberwolves.

Personal life
All four of Connelly's brothers, Pat, Joe, Dan, and Kevin, work as scouts or managers in the NBA or college basketball. Pat was previously the assistant general manager of the Phoenix Suns, while Joe works for the Washington Wizards in player development, Dan is an advanced scout for the Utah Jazz, and Kevin runs a scouting service for high school players. Connelly is a fan of the Baltimore Ravens and Baltimore Orioles. Connelly is married to wife, Negah. They have two children.

See also
List of National Basketball Association team presidents

References

Living people
Catholic University of America alumni
Denver Nuggets executives
Fordham University alumni
Minnesota Timberwolves executives
National Basketball Association general managers
New Orleans Hornets executives
Sportspeople from Baltimore
Washington Wizards executives
Year of birth missing (living people)